Ludovico Passini (Vienna, Austria, 1832 - Venice, November 5, 1902) was an Austrian-Italian painter, mostly of water-colors.

He initially enrolled in the Academy of Fine Arts in Vienna, but then transferred to Trieste, and then to Venice, where he was mentored by the water color painter Karl Werner. He followed Werner to Rome, and there Passini painted vedute of the region. But soon returned to Venice.

His watercolor, I Canonici a vespro, exhibited at the 1867 Exposition of Paris, was awarded the grand gold medal. He painted atmospheric scenes of every day, that is genre scenes, of life in Venice. One of his contemporaries was Carlo Van Haanen. Other works include:Monaci in Coro, la Maddalena, l'Abatino, Un ponte, Le donne al pozzo, La lettura del Tasso a Chioggia, and La vendita delle zucche a Venezia.

References

1832 births
1902 deaths
19th-century Italian painters
Italian male painters
20th-century Italian painters
Italian genre painters
Painters from Venice
19th-century Italian male artists
20th-century Italian male artists